The 7th Corps was one of seven corps of the Army of the Republic of Bosnia and Herzegovina and its headquarters were in Travnik. It was reorganized in January 1995.

History
This Corps was formed on February 26, 1994. It was created to advance north-westward through central Bosnia and Herzegovina.

Command and Commanders

Only commander: Mehmed Alagić 
Deputy Commander: Fikret Ćuskić
Chief of Staff: Colonel Kadir Jusić
Assistants for security: Colonel Ramiz Dugalić
Assistants of Logistics: Colonel Abdulah Jeleč 	  	 
Assistants of Finance: Major Mustafa Šanta

Corps of the Army of the Republic of Bosnia and Herzegovina